Francis Badgley may refer to:
Francis Badgley (merchant) (1767–1841), Canadian merchant, politician, and newspaper editor
Francis Badgley (doctor) (1807–1863), his son, Canadian physician